Iran Pro Sport News Agency (IPNA) is the national sports news agency of the Islamic Republic of Iran. IPNA is a main source of sports news distributed in the media in Iran.

External links
IPNA Official Website

News agencies based in Iran
Sport in Iran